Shoshenq (also commonly spelled Sheshonq, Sheshonk, Shoshenk) was the name of many Ancient Egyptians with Libu ancestry since the Third Intermediate Period.

People named Shoshenq
Several pharaohs with this name are known, as well as many important state officials:

Pharaohs
Shoshenq I, founder of the 22nd Dynasty, often identified as the Shishaq of the Hebrew Bible
Shoshenq IIa or simply Shoshenq II, of the 22nd Dynasty
Shoshenq IIb or Tutkheperre Shoshenq, of the 22nd Dynasty
Shoshenq III, of the 22nd Dynasty
Shoshenq IV, of the 22nd Dynasty
Shoshenq V, of the 22nd Dynasty
Shoshenq VI, of the 23rd Dynasty
Shoshenq VII (existence doubtful)

Officials
Shoshenq A, grandfather of Shoshenq I
Shoshenq C, a Theban High Priest of Amun, son of pharaoh Osorkon I
Shoshenq D, a High Priest of Ptah, son of pharaoh Osorkon II
Shoshenq, Chief steward of the God's Wife of Amun Ankhnesneferibre, buried in TT27

Renderings of Shoshenq in English

Because vowels are not generally written in the ancient Egyptian language, the exact pronunciation of this name has caused some amount of controversy, and it is common to see both Shoshenq and Sheshonq used in English-language publications. There is, however, some evidence indicating that Shoshenq is preferable.

First of all, it must be stated that the name "Shoshenq" originates in an ancient Libyco-Berber language, perhaps related to the Numidian Berber language used during the time of the Roman Empire. Unfortunately, unlike some other Libyan rulers of Ancient Egypt, there is no name in the corpus of Old Libyco-Berber text that might be an equivalent to the Egyptian rendering of the name.

Egyptologists conventionally transliterate the name in hieroglyphs as ššnq. In ancient Egyptian texts, writings without the [n] and/or (less commonly) the [q] are not uncommon. For example, the name is recorded in the Neo-Assyrian dialect of Akkadian as šusanqu and susinqu, indicating an initial rounded vowel. It is generally considered that the evidence suggests rendering it as "Sheshonq" should be avoided, in favour of "Shoshenq".

The writings of Manetho, as recorded by the Byzantine historians Sextus Julius Africanus, Eusebius of Caesarea, and George Syncellus use two general forms (with variations depending on the manuscript). Africanus spells the name Σεσωγχις [Sesōnkhis], while Eusebius (as quoted by George Syncellus) uses Σεσογχωσις [Sesonkhōsis]. The alteration in the vowels [o] and [e] is probably due to metathesis.

References

Sources
Aidan Dodson (1995). “Rise & Fall of The House of Shoshenq: The Libyan Centuries of Egyptian History.” KMT: A Modern Journal of Ancient Egypt 6 (3):52–67.
Jürgen von Beckerath (1997). Chronologie des Pharaonischen Ägypten, Mainz: Philip Von Zabern.

Ancient Egyptian given names
Berber words and phrases